Arsen Shakhlamazovich Alakhverdiyev (born 24 January 1949) is a retired Russian flyweight freestyle wrestler who won silver medals at the 1972 Olympics and 1973 World Championships. He held the European title in 1972, 1973 and 1975 and the World Cup in 1973. Domestically, Alakhverdiyev won the Soviet title in 1975, placing second in 1972, 1974, 1976 and 1977 and third in 1971. 

Alakhverdiyev was born in a remote village and took up wrestling in September 1964 when he began his studies in the regional capital, Makhachkala. He was motivated by example of the Dagestani wrestler Ali Aliyev. Alakhverdiyev then knew little about technique, but was well trained, and could do one-handed pull-ups. He retired at the age of 30, and then worked for one year as an engineer, before returning to wrestling as a coach. His son Velikhan also became a wrestler and won medals at the European championships.

References

External links
 

1949 births
Living people
People from Dagestan
Sportspeople from Dagestan
Olympic wrestlers of the Soviet Union
Wrestlers at the 1972 Summer Olympics
Soviet male sport wrestlers
Russian male sport wrestlers
Olympic silver medalists for the Soviet Union
Olympic medalists in wrestling
Medalists at the 1972 Summer Olympics
European Wrestling Champions
World Wrestling Championships medalists
Burevestnik (sports society) athletes